IRIC may refer to:

Institut de recherche en immunologie et en cancérologie de l’Université de Montréal
International Relations Institute of Cameroon